Dehumanization is the denial of full humanness in others and the cruelty and suffering that accompanies it. A practical definition refers to it as the viewing and treatment of other people as though they lack the mental capacities that are commonly attributed to human beings. In this definition, every act or thought that regards a person as "less than" human is dehumanization.

Dehumanization is one technique in incitement to genocide. It has also been used to justify war, judicial and extrajudicial killing, slavery, abortion, the confiscation of property, denial of suffrage and other rights, and to attack enemies or political opponents.

Conceptualizations 

Behaviorally, dehumanization describes a disposition towards others that debases the others' individuality as either an "individual" species or an "individual" object (e.g., someone who acts inhumanely towards humans). As a process, dehumanization may be understood as the opposite of personification, a figure of speech in which inanimate objects or abstractions are endowed with human qualities; dehumanization then is the disendowment of these same qualities or a reduction to abstraction.

In almost all contexts, dehumanization is used pejoratively along with a disruption of social norms, with the former applying to the actor(s) of behavioral dehumanization and the latter applying to the action(s) or processes of dehumanization. For instance, there is dehumanization for those who are perceived as lacking in culture or civility, which are concepts that are believed to distinguish humans from animals. Social norms define humane behavior and reflexively define what is outside of humane behavior or inhumane. Dehumanization differs from inhumane behaviors or processes in its breadth to propose competing social norms. It is an action of dehumanization as the old norms are depreciated to the competing new norms, which then redefine the action of dehumanization. If the new norms lose acceptance, then the action remains one of dehumanization. The definition of dehumanization remains in a reflexive state of a type-token ambiguity relative to both individual and societal scales.

In biological terms, dehumanization can be described as an introduced species marginalizing the human species, or an introduced person/process that debases other people inhumanely.

In political science and jurisprudence, the act of dehumanization is the inferential alienation of human rights or denaturalization of natural rights, a definition contingent upon presiding international law rather than social norms limited by human geography. In this context, a specialty within species does not need to constitute global citizenship or its inalienable rights; the human genome inherits both.

It is theorized that dehumanization takes on two forms: animalistic dehumanization, which is employed on a mostly intergroup basis; and mechanistic dehumanization, which is employed on a mostly interpersonal basis. Dehumanization can occur discursively (e.g., idiomatic language that likens individual human beings to non-human animals, verbal abuse, erasing one's voice from discourse), symbolically (e.g., imagery), or physically (e.g., chattel slavery, physical abuse, refusing eye contact). Dehumanization often ignores the target's individuality (i.e., the creative and exciting aspects of their personality) and can hinder one from feeling empathy or correctly understanding a stigmatized group.

Dehumanization may be carried out by a social institution (such as a state, school, or family), interpersonally, or even within oneself. Dehumanization can be unintentional, especially upon individuals, as with some types of de facto racism. State-organized dehumanization has historically been directed against perceived political, racial, ethnic, national, or religious minority groups. Other minoritized and marginalized individuals and groups (based on sexual orientation, gender, disability, class, or some other organizing principle) are also susceptible to various forms of dehumanization. The concept of dehumanization has received empirical attention in the psychological literature. It is conceptually related to infrahumanization, delegitimization, moral exclusion, and objectification. Dehumanization occurs across several domains; it is facilitated by status, power, and social connection; and results in behaviors like exclusion, violence, and support for violence against others.

"Dehumanisation is viewed as a central component to intergroup violence because it is frequently the most important precursor to moral exclusion, the process by which stigmatized groups are placed outside the boundary in which moral values, rules, and considerations of fairness apply."

David Livingstone Smith, director and founder of The Human Nature Project at the University of New England, argues that historically, human beings have been dehumanizing one another for thousands of years. In his work "The Paradoxes of Dehumanization", Smith proposes that dehumanization simultaneously regards people as human and subhuman. This paradox comes to light, as Smith identifies, because the reason people are dehumanized is so their human attributes can be taken advantage of.

Humanness 
In Herbert Kelman's work on dehumanization, humanness has two features: "identity" (i.e., a perception of the person "as an individual, independent and distinguishable from others, capable of making choices") and "community" (i.e., a perception of the person as "part of an interconnected network of individuals who care for each other"). When a target's agency and embeddedness in a community are denied, they no longer elicit compassion or other moral responses and may suffer violence.

Objectification 
Psychologist Barbara Fredrickson and Tomi-Ann Roberts argued that the sexual objectification of women extends beyond pornography (which emphasizes women's bodies over their uniquely human mental and emotional characteristics) to society generally. There is a normative emphasis on female appearance that causes women to take a third-person perspective on their bodies. The psychological distance women may feel from their bodies might cause them to dehumanize themselves. Some research has indicated that women and men exhibit a "sexual body part recognition bias", in which women's sexual body parts are better recognized when presented in isolation than in their entire bodies. In contrast, men's sexual body parts are better recognized in the context of their entire bodies than in isolation. Men who dehumanize women as either animals or objects are more liable to rape and sexually harass women and display more negative attitudes toward female rape victims.

Philosopher Martha Nussbaum identified seven components of sexual objectification: instrumentality, denial of autonomy, inertness, fungibility, violability, ownership, and denial of subjectivity.

In this context, instrumentality refers to when the objectified is used as an instrument to the objectifier's benefit. Denial of autonomy occurs in the form of the objectifier underestimating the objectified and denies their capabilities. In the case of inertness, the objectified is treated as if they are lazy and indolent. Fungibility brands the objectified to be easily replaceable. Volability is when the objectifier does not respect the objectified person's personal space or boundaries. Ownership is when the objectified is seen as another person's property. Lastly, the denial of subjectivity is a lack of sympathy for the objectified, or the dismissal of the notion that the objectified has feelings. These seven components cause the objectifier to view the objectified in a disrespectful way, therefore treating them so.

History

Native Americans

Native Americans were dehumanized as "merciless Indian savages" in the United States Declaration of Independence. Following the Wounded Knee massacre in December 1890, author L. Frank Baum wrote:The Pioneer has before declared that our only safety depends upon the total extermination [sic] of the Indians. Having wronged them for centuries we had better, in order to protect our civilization, follow it up by one more wrong and wipe these untamed and untamable creatures from the face of the earth. In this lies safety for our settlers and the soldiers who are under incompetent commands. Otherwise, we may expect future years to be as full of trouble with the redskins as those have been in the past. In Martin Luther King Jr.'s book on civil rights, Why We Can't Wait, he wrote:

Our nation was born in genocide when it embraced the doctrine that the original American, the Indian, was an inferior race. Even before there were large numbers of Negroes on our shores, the scar of racial hatred had already disfigured colonial society. From the sixteenth century forward, blood flowed in battles over racial supremacy. We are perhaps the only nation which tried as a matter of national policy to wipe out its indigenous population. Moreover, we elevated that tragic experience into a noble crusade. Indeed, even today we have not permitted ourselves to reject or to feel remorse for this shameful episode. Our literature, our films, our drama, our folklore all exalt it.

King was an active supporter of the Native American rights movement, which he drew parallels with his own leadership of the civil rights movement. Both movements aimed to overturn dehumanizing attitudes held by members of the public at large against them.

Causes and facilitating factors 

Several lines of psychological research relate to the concept of dehumanization. Infrahumanization suggests that individuals think of and treat outgroup members as "less human" and more like animals; while Austrian ethnologist Irenäus Eibl-Eibesfeldt uses the term pseudo-speciation, a term that he borrowed from the psychoanalyst Erik Erikson, to imply that the dehumanized person or persons are regarded as not members of the human species. Specifically, individuals associate secondary emotions (which are seen as uniquely human) more with the ingroup than with the outgroup. Primary emotions (those experienced by all sentient beings, whether human or other animals) are found to be more associated with the outgroup. Dehumanization is intrinsically connected with violence. Often, one cannot do serious injury to another without first dehumanizing him or her in one's mind (as a form of rationalization). Military training is, among other things, systematic desensitization and dehumanization of the enemy, and military personnel may find it psychologically necessary to refer to the enemy as an animal or other non-human beings. Lt. Col. Dave Grossman has shown that without such desensitization it would be difficult, if not impossible, for one human to kill another human, even in combat or under threat to their own lives.

According to Daniel Bar-Tal, delegitimization is the "categorization of groups into extreme negative social categories which are excluded from human groups that are considered as acting within the limits of acceptable norms and values".

Moral exclusion occurs when outgroups are subject to a different set of moral values, rules, and fairness than are used in social relations with ingroup members. When individuals dehumanize others, they no longer experience distress when they treat them poorly. Moral exclusion is used to explain extreme behaviors like genocide, harsh immigration policies, and eugenics, but it can also happen on a more regular, everyday discriminatory level. In laboratory studies, people who are portrayed as lacking human qualities are treated in a particularly harsh and violent manner.

Dehumanized perception occurs when a subject experiences low frequencies of activation within their social cognition neural network. This includes areas of neural networking such as the superior temporal sulcus (STS) and the medial prefrontal cortex (mPFC). A 2001 study by psychologists Chris and Uta Frith suggests that the criticality of social interaction within a neural network has tendencies for subjects to dehumanize those seen as disgust-inducing, leading to social disengagement. Tasks involving social cognition typically activate the neural network responsible for subjective projections of disgust-inducing perceptions and patterns of dehumanization. "Besides manipulations of target persons, manipulations of social goals validate this prediction: Inferring preference, a mental-state inference, significantly increases mPFC and STS activity to these otherwise dehumanized targets." A 2007 study by Harris, McClure, van den Bos, Cohen and Fiske suggests that a person's choice to dehumanize another person is due to decreased neural activity towards the projected target. This decreased neural activity is identified as low medial prefrontal cortex activation, which is associated with perceiving social information.

While social distance from the outgroup target is a necessary condition for dehumanization, some research suggests that this alone is insufficient. Psychological research has identified high status, power, and social connection as additional factors. Members of high-status groups more often associate humanity with the ingroup than the outgroup, while members of low-status groups exhibit no differences in associations with humanity. Thus, having a high status makes one more likely to dehumanize others. Low-status groups are more associated with human nature traits (e.g., warmth, emotionalism) than uniquely human characteristics, implying that they are closer to animals than humans because these traits are typical of humans but can be seen in other species. In addition, another line of work found that individuals in a position of power were more likely to objectify their subordinates, treating them as a means to one's end rather than focusing on their essentially human qualities. Finally, social connection—thinking about a close other or being in the actual presence of a close other—enables dehumanization by reducing the attribution of human mental states, increasing support for treating targets like animals, and increasing willingness to endorse harsh interrogation tactics. This is counterintuitive because social connection has documented personal health and well-being benefits but appears to impair intergroup relations.

Neuroimaging studies have discovered that the medial prefrontal cortex—a brain region distinctively involved in attributing mental states to others—shows diminished activation to extremely dehumanized targets (i.e., those rated, according to the stereotype content model, as low-warmth and low-competence, such as drug addicts or homeless people).

Race and ethnicity 

Dehumanization often occurs as a result of intergroup conflict. Ethnic and racial others are often represented as animals in popular culture and scholarship. There is evidence that this representation persists in the American context with African Americans implicitly associated with apes. To the extent that an individual has this dehumanizing implicit association, they are more likely to support violence against African Americans (e.g., jury decisions to execute defendants). Historically, dehumanization is frequently connected to genocidal conflicts in that ideologies before and during the conflict depict victims as subhuman (e.g., rodents). Immigrants may also be dehumanized in this manner.

In 1901, the six Australian colonies assented to federation, creating the modern nation state of Australia and its government. Section 51 (xxvi) excluded Aboriginals from the groups protected by special laws, and section 127 excluded Aboriginals from population counts. The Commonwealth Franchise Act 1902 categorically denied Aboriginals the right to vote. Indigenous Australians were not allowed the social security benefits (e.g., aged pensions and maternity allowances) which were provided to others. Aboriginals in rural areas were discriminated against and controlled as to where and how they could marry, work, live, and their movements.

Language
Dehumanization and dehumanized perception can occur as a result of the language used to describe groups of people. Words such as migrant, immigrant, and expatriate are assigned to foreigners based on their social status and wealth, rather than ability, achievements, or political alignment. Expatriate is a word to describe the privileged, often light-skinned people newly residing in an area and has connotations that suggest ability, wealth, and trust. Meanwhile, the word immigrant is used to describe people coming to a new location to reside and infers a much less-desirable meaning.

The word "immigrant" is sometimes paired with "illegal", which harbors a profoundly derogatory connotation. Misuse of these terms—they are often used inaccurately—to describe the other, can alter the perception of a group as a whole in a negative way. Ryan Eller, the executive director of the immigrant advocacy group Define American, expressed the problem this way: 
A series of language examinations found a direct relation between homophobic epithets and social cognitive distancing towards a group of homosexuals, a form of dehumanization. These epithets (e.g., faggot) were thought to function as dehumanizing labels because they tended to act as markers of deviance. One pair of studies found that subjects were more likely to associate malignant language with homosexuals, and that such language associations increased the physical distancing between the subject and the homosexual. This indicated that the malignant language could encourage dehumanization, cognitive and physical distancing in ways that other forms of malignant language do not.

Human races 
In the U.S., African Americans were dehumanized by being classified as non-human primates. A California police officer who was also involved in the Rodney King beating described a dispute between an American Black couple as "something right out of Gorillas in the Mist". Franz Boas and Charles Darwin hypothesized that there might be an evolutionary process among primates. Monkeys and apes were least evolved, then savage and deformed anthropoids, which referred to people of African ancestry, to Caucasians as most developed.

Property takeover 

Property scholars define dehumanization as “the failure to recognize an individual's or group's humanity.” Dehumanization often occurs alongside property confiscation. When a property takeover is coupled with dehumanization, the result is a dignity taking. There are several examples of dignity takings involving dehumanization.

From its founding, the United States repeatedly engaged in dignity takings from Native American populations, taking indigenous land in an "undeniably horrific, violent, and tragic record" of genocide and ethnocide. As recently as 2013, the degradation of a mountain sacred to the Hopi people—by spraying its peak pot with artificial snow made from wastewater—constituted another dignity taking by the U.S. Forest Service.

The 1921 Tulsa race massacre also constituted a dignity taking involving dehumanization. White rioters dehumanized African Americans by attacking, looting, and destroying homes and businesses in Greenwood, a predominantly Black neighborhood known as "Black Wall Street".

During the Holocaust, mass genocide—a severe form of dehumanization—accompanied the destruction and taking of Jewish property. This constituted a dignity taking.

Undocumented workers in the United States have also been subject to dehumanizing dignity takings when employers treat them as machines instead of people to justify dangerous working conditions. When harsh conditions lead to bodily injury or death, the property destroyed is the physical body.

Media-driven dehumanization 
The propaganda model of Edward S. Herman and Noam Chomsky argues that corporate media are able to carry out large-scale, successful dehumanization campaigns when they promote the goals (profit-making) that the corporations are contractually obliged to maximize. State media are also capable of carrying out dehumanization campaigns, whether in democracies or dictatorships, which are pervasive enough that the population cannot avoid the dehumanizing memes.

Non-state actors 
Non-state actors—terrorists in particular—have also resorted to dehumanization to further their cause. The 1960s terrorist group Weather Underground had advocated violence against any authority figure and used the "police are pigs" meme to convince members that they were not harming human beings but merely killing wild animals. Likewise, rhetoric statements such as "terrorists are just scum", is an act of dehumanization.

In science, medicine, and technology 

Relatively recent history has seen the relationship between dehumanization and science result in unethical scientific research. The Tuskegee syphilis experiment, Unit 731, and Nazi human experimentation on Jewish people are three such examples. In the former, African Americans with syphilis were recruited to participate in a study about the course of the disease. Even when treatment and a cure were eventually developed, they were withheld from the African-American participants so that researchers could continue their study. Similarly, Nazi scientists during the Holocaust conducted horrific experiments on Jewish people and Shiro Ishii's Unit 731 also did so to Chinese, Russian, Mongolian, American, and other nationalities held captive. Both were justified in the name of research and progress, which is indicative of the far-reaching effects that the culture of dehumanization had upon this society. When this research came to light, efforts were made to protect future research participants, and currently, institutional review boards exist to safeguard individuals from being exploited by scientists.

In a medical context, some dehumanizing practices have become more acceptable. While the dissection of human cadavers was seen as dehumanizing in the Dark Ages (see history of anatomy), the value of dissections as a training aid is such that they are now more widely accepted. Dehumanization has been associated with modern medicine generally and has explicitly been suggested as a coping mechanism for doctors who work with patients at the end of life. Researchers have identified six potential causes of dehumanization in medicine: deindividuating practices, impaired patient agency, dissimilarity (causes which do not facilitate the delivery of medical treatment), mechanization, empathy reduction, and moral disengagement (which could be argued to facilitate the delivery of medical treatment).

In some US states, legislation requires that a woman view ultrasound images of her fetus before having an abortion. Critics of the law argue that merely seeing an image of the fetus humanizes it and biases women against abortion. Similarly, a recent study showed that subtle humanization of medical patients appears to improve care for these patients. Radiologists evaluating X-rays reported more details to patients and expressed more empathy when a photo of the patient's face accompanied the X-rays. It appears that the inclusion of the photos counteracts the dehumanization of the medical process.

Dehumanization has applications outside traditional social contexts. Anthropomorphism (i.e., perceiving mental and physical capacities that reflect humans in nonhuman entities) is the inverse of dehumanization. Waytz, Epley, and Cacioppo suggest that the inverse of the factors that facilitate dehumanization (e.g., high status, power, and social connection) should promote anthropomorphism. That is, a low status, socially disconnected person without power should be more likely to attribute human qualities to pets or inanimate objects than a high-status, high-power, socially connected person.

Researchers have found that engaging in violent video game play diminishes perceptions of both one's own humanity and the humanity of the players who are targets of the game violence. While the players are dehumanized, the video game characters are often anthropomorphized.

Dehumanization has occurred historically under the pretense of "progress in the name of science". During the 1904 Louisiana Purchase Exposition, human zoos exhibited several natives from independent tribes worldwide, most notably a young Congolese man, Ota Benga. Benga's imprisonment was put on display as a public service showcasing "a degraded and degenerate race". During this period, religion was still the driving force behind many political and scientific activities. Because of this, eugenics was widely supported among the most notable U.S. scientific communities, political figures, and industrial elites. After relocating to New York in 1906, public outcry led to the permanent ban and closure of human zoos in the United States.

In art  
Spanish romanticism painter Francisco Goya often depicted subjectivity involving the atrocities of war and brutal violence conveying the process of dehumanization. In the romantic period of painting, martyrdom art was most often a means of deifying the oppressed and tormented, and it was common for Goya to depict evil personalities performing these acts; however, he broke convention by dehumanizing these martyr figures: "...one would not know whom the painting depicts, so determinedly has Goya reduced his subjects from martyrs to meat".

See also

References

External links 
 https://web.archive.org/web/20100929000211/http://www.psychwiki.com/wiki/Dehumanization

Abuse
Bullying
Genocide
Harassment
Interpersonal relationships
Moral psychology
Prejudice and discrimination
Social psychology concepts
Social inequality
Terrorism tactics
Violence